El Ain, also written Al Ain and Al Ayn, is a transliteration of ,  and may refer to:
 Al Ain, a city in Abu Dhabi, United Arab Emirates
Al Ain Region
Al Ain Oasis
Al Ain FC, a football club
 Al-Ayn, Oman, an archaeological site in Oman
 El Ain, Tunisia, a town in Sfax Governorate, Tunisia
 El Ain, Ash Shamal, Lebanon, a town in Batroun District, North Governorate, Lebanon
 El Ain, Beqaa, Lebanon, a town in Baalbek District, Beqaa Governorate, Lebanon
 El Ain, Jabal Lubnan, Lebanon (North), a town in Keserwan District, Mount Lebanon Governorate, Lebanon
 El Ain, Jabal Lubnan, Lebanon (South), a town in Baabda District, Mount Lebanon Governorate, Lebanon

See also 
 Ain (disambiguation)
 Ayn (disambiguation)